The following is a list of presidents of the Marshall Islands, since the establishment of that office in 1979. The president of the Republic of the Marshall Islands is the head of state and government of the Marshall Islands. The President is elected by the Nitijeļā (Legislature) from among its members. Presidents pick cabinet members from the Nitijeļā.

Amata Kabua was elected as the first President of the Republic in 1979.  Subsequently, he was re-elected to four-year terms in 1983, 1987, 1991, and 1996.  After Amata Kabua's death in office, his first cousin, Imata Kabua, won a special election in 1997. Casten Nemra, who was elected and took office in January 2016, was replaced by Hilda Heine one week later. The current Marshallese president, David Kabua, is the son of Amata Kabua.

List of presidents

See also
 Government of the Marshall Islands
 Minister in Assistance to the President of Marshall Islands
 High Commissioner of the Trust Territory of the Pacific Islands
 List of colonial governors of the Marshall Islands

References

Government of the Marshall Islands

Marshall Islands
Presidents
1979 establishments in the Marshall Islands